Argentina revolucionaria (English: Revolutionary Argentina) is a 1948 Argentine documentary film directed by Lucio Berto and written by the same Berto and José Gallegos. It was premiered on May 6, 1948.

The film describes the social and economic politics of Argentina during the first years of government of Juan Domingo Perón and includes footage of his inauguration ceremony on June 4, 1946.

References

External links
 

1948 films
1940s Spanish-language films
Argentine black-and-white films
1948 documentary films
Argentine documentary films
1940s Argentine films